The  Eagle EA-100 is an American light-sport aircraft that was designed and produced by Eagle Aviation LLC of Oshkosh, Wisconsin and introduced in 2008. When it was available the aircraft was supplied as complete ready-to-fly-aircraft.

The company website expired in March 2013 and was not renewed. It is likely that the company is out of business and production has ended.

Design and development
The EA-100 was designed to comply with the US light-sport aircraft rules. It features a strut-braced high-wing, a two-seats-in-side-by-side configuration enclosed cockpit accessed by two vertical-hinged doors, fixed tricycle landing gear and a single engine in tractor configuration.

The aircraft is made from aluminum sheet. The standard engine is the  Rotax 912ULS four-stroke powerplant while the standard propeller is a Sensenich composite ground adjustable type.

Operational history
By August 2019 two examples had been registered with the US Federal Aviation Administration.

Specifications (version)

References

External links

Light-sport aircraft
Single-engined tractor aircraft